The 1990 NCAA Division I men's basketball championship game was the final round of the 1990 NCAA Division I men's basketball tournament. It determined the national champion for the 1989–90 NCAA Division I men's basketball season, and was contested by the East Regional Champions, No. 3-seeded Duke Blue Devils and the West Regional Champions, No. 1-seeded UNLV Runnin' Rebels. Both teams were seeking their first national title. The game was played on April 2, 1990 at McNichols Sports Arena in Denver, Colorado. The Runnin' Rebels defeated the Blue Devils, 103–73, to claim their first, and only, NCAA title. It was also the first title for head coach Jerry Tarkanian. UNLV guard Anderson Hunt was named the NCAA Tournament Most Outstanding Player (MOP).

The 30-point margin of victory remains the largest in championship game history.

Participating teams
This was the first national championship game between the two schools. Duke was playing in the Final Four for the fourth time in five seasons, and was playing in the championship game for the fourth time (1964, 1978, 1986). UNLV was playing in the championship game for the first time.

Duke

East
Duke (3) 81, Richmond (14) 46
Duke 76, St. Johns (6) 72
Duke 90, UCLA (7) 81
Duke 79, Connecticut (1) 78
Final Four
Duke 97, Arkansas (4) 83

UNLV

West
UNLV (1) 102, Arkansas-Little Rock (16) 72
UNLV 76, Ohio State (8) 65
UNLV 69, Ball State (12) 67
UNLV 131, Loyola Marymount (11) 101
Final Four
UNLV 90, Georgia Tech (4) 81

Starting lineups

Game summary
Duke won the jump ball to begin the game and Phil Henderson put up a three-point shot attempt that hit off iron and was rebounded by Stacey Augmon. After the teams traded turnovers, Greg Anthony opened the scoring with a 17-foot jumper from the top of the key. After a low-post bucket by Larry Johnson put the Rebels up 4–0, Duke got on the board with a pair of free throws by Alaa Abdelnaby. UNLV maintained a slight lead for the next few possessions. Around the 17-minute mark, Duke's Robert Brickey scored inside and was fouled for a chance to tie the game at 7 with a free throw. Brickey missed the foul shot and that is as close as the Blue Devils would get for the remainder of the ballgame. UNLV led 11–6 at the under 16 media timeout. Augmon forced Duke's 7th turnover of the half and took it in for the dunk to give UNLV its first double-digit lead at 21-11 at the under 12 timeout. After reserve Barry Young hit a three-point shot to put UNLV up 30–17, analyst Billy Packer said, Jerry Tarkanian's towel is under is seat. He's gotta be comfortable right now, eluding to significant contributions from the Runnin' Rebels bench players. After a three-point play from Larry Johnson and an alley-oop pass from half court from point guard Anthony to Augmon, UNLV's lead ballooned to 16 at 41-25. Duke would shave a few points off the deficit in the final minutes to make the halftime score 47-35, UNLV. At the break, the Runnin' Rebels held a 17-4 advantage in fast break points.

Duke opened the second half with possession, but failed to score. UNLV drew a third personal foul from Duke's Christian Laettner on the following possession  one that eventually ended with a three-pointer from Larry Johnson and a 5035 lead. Duke trimmed the lead to 10 with 16:24 remaining, but an Anderson Hunt jumper made the score 59-47 at the under 16 media timeout. The Rebels continued to push the pace as a bucket from Johnson, a three-pointer from Hunt, and a transition layup from Hunt made it 6647 with 14:49 to go. In between two Duke timeouts, UNLV's devastating run was extended to 180, and a 7547 lead, before Duke's next points. At this point, the Rebels had a 336 advantage on the fast break. Johnson, a consensus All-American, ended with 22 points and 11 rebounds, and Tournament MOP Hunt compiled 29 points on 12-16 shooting. UNLV shattered UCLA's championship game margin record from 1968 (23 points) in coasting to the 10373 victory.

Media coverage
The championship game was televised in the United States by CBS. Brent Musburger provided play-by-play, while Billy Packer provided color commentary.

Notables
 UNLV's 30-point margin of victory in the championship game is a tournament record.
 UNLV's 103–73 win over Duke marked the first, (and to date, only), time in the history of the tournament that at least 100 points were scored in the championship game.
To date, UNLV remains the last team from a non-power conference (AAC, ACC, Big East, Big Ten, Big 12, Pac-12, and SEC) to win the national championship; and the only one since 1977.
The championship game was UNLV’s eleventh-consecutive win. They would eventually run the win streak to an astounding 45 games. That is the fourth-longest win streak in NCAA Division 1 basketball history, and the longest win streak since the longest one ever (by UCLA) ended in 1974.

References

NCAA Division I Men's Basketball Championship Game
NCAA Division I Men's Basketball Championship Games
Duke Blue Devils men's basketball
UNLV Runnin' Rebels basketball
College sports tournaments in Colorado
Basketball competitions in Denver
NCAA Division I Men's Basketball Championship Game
NCAA Division I Basketball Championship Game, 1990
NCAA Division I Basketball Championship Game